Amoltepec may refer to:

San Cristóbal Amoltepec, Oaxaca
Santiago Amoltepec, Oaxaca
Amoltepec Mixtec language